Petraitis is the masculine form of a patronymic Lithuanian family name. Its feminine forms  are: Petraitienė (married to or widow of Petraitis) and Petraitytė (unmarried woman, daughter of Petraitis).

Notable people with the surname include:

 Julius Petraitis (born 1905), Lithuanian long-distance runner
 Vikki Petraitis (born 1965), Australian true crime author

Lithuanian-language surnames